Sean Theriault is a professor in the Department of Government at the University of Texas, Austin. He specializes in American politics with particular interests focusing on the U.S. Congress, American political development, and political history. He is a 2004 winner of the Eyes of Texas Excellence Award.

Theriault has published articles on presidential rhetoric, congressional careers, issue framing, the Compromise of 1850, and public approval of Congress. His current research is on the party polarization in the U.S. Congress.

Books
 Theriault, Sean M. The Gingrich Senators: the roots of partisan warfare in Congress	Oxford : Oxford University Press, 2013, 
Theriault, Sean M. Party Polarization in Congress. Cambridge: Cambridge University Press, 2008.According to WorldCat, the book is held in 428 libraries  
Theriault, Sean M. The Power of the People: Congressional Competition, Public Attention, and Voter Retribution. Columbus: Ohio State University Press, 2005.

References

External links 
 Sean Theriault bio on the University of Texas at Austin website

University of Texas at Austin faculty
American political scientists
Living people
1972 births